Huxley College may refer to:
 Huxley College of the Environment, an interdisciplinary environmental college at Western Washington University.
 Huxley College, a fictional college in the famous 1932 Marx Brothers film, Horse Feathers.